Ajit Anantrao Pawar (Marathi pronunciation: [əd͡ʒit̪ pəʋaːɾ]; born 22 July 1959) is an Indian politician. He is the Leader of the Opposition in Maharashtra Legislative Assembly, and was the 8th Deputy Chief Minister of Maharashtra in his latest stint as a minister.  He was guardian minister for the District of Pune, India.

He is a member of the Maharashtra Legislative Assembly representing Baramati constituency. He is the nephew of Sharad Pawar, chief of Nationalist Congress Party. Besides being the Deputy Chief Minister of Maharashtra, he was also the Finance Minister of Maharashtra.

Early life 
Pawar was born on 22 July 1959 at his grandfather's place in Deolali Pravara, Ahmednagar district. He completed his schooling in Deolali Pravara. He hails from the village of Katevadi in Baramati taluka, Pune district. He is nephew of the Nationalist Congress Party President, Sharad Pawar. Pawar is son of Sharad Pawar's elder brother, Anantrao Pawar. Anantrao had initially worked for renowned film maker V.Shantaram's Rajkamal Studios in Mumbai. Pawar's grandfather, Govindrao Pawar, was employed with Baramati Co-operative trading and his grandmother looked after the family farm.

Pawar was pursuing a college degree; however, due to the death of his father, he dropped out to help take care of his family. He is educated up to Secondary school level and holds the Secondary School Certificate (SSC) from the Maharashtra State Board.

Political career
While Pawar was pursuing his primary education at Deolali Pravara, his uncle, Sharad Pawar was a rising political figure in the ruling Congress party. Pawar moved to then Bombay for more extensive education. Pawar made his foray into politics in 1982, when he was elected to the board of a cooperative sugar factory. He was elected as a chairman of the Pune District Co-operative Bank (PDC) in 1991 and remained in post for 16 years. During this period he was also elected as Member of parliament, Lok Sabha from the Baramati Parliamentary Constituency. He later vacated his Lok Sabha seat in favour of his uncle, Sharad Pawar, who had then become the defence minister in PV Narasimha Rao's government. Later, he was elected as a Member of the Maharashtra Legislative Assembly (MLA) from Baramati Assembly Constituency. Pawar was re-elected from the same constituency in 1995, 1999, 2004, 2009, and 2014.
He went on to become the Minister of State for Agriculture and Power (June 1991 - November 1992) in Sudhakarrao Naik's government.

He became the Minister of State for Soil Conservation, Power and Planning (November 1992 - February 1993) when Sharad Pawar returned to the state as the Chief Minister. When the Indian National Congress-NCP coalition came into power in 1999, Pawar was promoted to cabinet minister in the Irrigation Department (October 1999 - December 2003) in Vilasrao Deshmukh's government. He was given additional charge of the Rural Development Department (December 2003 - October 2004) in Sushilkumar Shinde's government.
When Congress-NCP combination returned to power in 2004, he retained the Water Resources Ministry in Deshmukh's government and later in Ashok Chavan's government.

On 23 November 2019, Pawar was sworn as Deputy Chief Minister of Maharashtra State with BJP without his party's consent. He submitted paper with signatures of NCP MLAs to Governor of State. He was on the post for less than 80 hours, becoming Deputy CM with the shortest tenure in Devendra Fadnavis led government. On 1 December 2019, it was announced that Pawar would take over as Deputy Chief Minister for the Maha Vikas Aghadi administration after the commencement of the winter session of the state legislature on 16 December.

Controversies 

There are allegations that, as the minister for water resources, he spared no efforts to help in the development of Lavasa, a project touted as a "vision of Sharad Pawar". The Maharashtra Krishna Valley Development Corporation (MKVDC) leased  to Lavasa in August 2002, which included part of the Warasgaon dam reservoir. The lease between MKVDC and Lavasa was executed at rates far below the market rate.

He told the Indian Election Commission in 2004 that he had financial assets of more than 3 crore Rupees at that time.

In September 2012, there were accusations that there had been misappropriation of funds amounting to  70,000 Crores. These allegations were made by the Maharashtra bureaucrat, Vijay Pandhare, and caused Anjali Damania to request Pawar's resignation as a minister. However, the allegations were not proven, and he was successfully reinstated as the Deputy Chief Minister of Maharashtra.

On 7 April 2013, Pawar in an attempt at being comical about his inability to bring waters to the dams, made a controversial statement in a speech at Indapur. Activists were fasting for 55 days in Maharashtra, against the Maharashtra government and their incompetence of not providing relief in the form of water to citizens suffering from the drought. In response to this, in a speech at large crowd gathering, Pawar stated: "If there is no water in the dam ... Should we urinate into it?". Due to the political and media pressure, he publicly apologized for the statement, admitting that the comment was the biggest mistake of his life.

See also
 Sharad Pawar
Deputy Chief Minister of Maharashtra

References

External links
 

1959 births
Living people
People from Baramati
India MPs 1991–1996
Deputy Chief Ministers of Maharashtra
Maharashtra MLAs 1990–1995
Maharashtra MLAs 1999–2004
Maharashtra MLAs 1995–1999
Maharashtra MLAs 2004–2009
Maharashtra MLAs 2009–2014
Lok Sabha members from Maharashtra
Maharashtra MLAs 2014–2019
Corruption in Maharashtra
Nationalist Congress Party politicians from Maharashtra